
Gmina Śrem is an urban-rural gmina (administrative district) in Śrem County, Greater Poland Voivodeship, in west-central Poland.

The gmina contains part of the protected area called Chłapowski Landscape Park.

Villages
Apart from the town of Śrem, Gmina Śrem contains the villages and settlements of Barbarki, Binkowo, Błociszewo, Bodzyniewo, Borgowo, Bystrzek, Dąbrowa, Dalewo, Dobczyn, Gaj, Góra, Grobelka, Grodzewo, Grzymysław, Jeleńczewo, Kadzewo, Kaleje, Kawcze, Kotowo, Krzyżanowo, Łęg, Luciny, Marianowo, Marszewo, Mateuszewo, Mechlin, Mórka, Niesłabin, Nochówko, Nochowo, Olsza, Orkowo, Ostrowo, Pełczyn, Psarskie, Pucołowo, Pysząca, Sosnowiec, Szymanowo, Tesiny, Wirginowo, Wyrzeka and Zbrudzewo.

Neighbouring gminas
Gmina Śrem is bordered by the gminas of Brodnica, Czempiń, Dolsk, Kórnik, Krzywiń, Książ Wielkopolski and Zaniemyśl.

References
Polish official population figures 2006

Srem
Śrem County